Pamela Sue Martin (born January 5, 1953) is an American actress, who is best known for starring as Nancy Drew on the television series The Hardy Boys/Nancy Drew Mysteries (1977-1979) and as socialite Fallon Carrington Colby on the ABC soap opera Dynasty (1981-1984), winning a Bambi Award for the latter in 1984.

Life and career
Born in Westport, Connecticut, Martin began modeling at 17 and appeared in The Poseidon Adventure in 1972, at age 19. More films followed, including Our Time and Buster and Billie. 

Later, her work as ABC-TV's Nancy Drew made her something of a teen idol. Initially, the ABC program alternated each week between The Nancy Drew Mysteries and The Hardy Boys Mysteries. In season 2, the shows were merged and renamed The Hardy Boys/Nancy Drew Mysteries,  which led to Nancy's role being reduced. This frustrated Martin, who left the series as a result. Her final appearance as Nancy aired on January 1, 1978.

Martin appeared in a cover pictorial in the July 1978 issue of Playboy magazine, with the headline "TV's Nancy Drew Undraped". In the magazine, she cited the merger of the two shows as her reason for quitting the series.

Martin portrayed feisty and spoiled heiress Fallon Carrington Colby on the ABC nighttime soap opera Dynasty from its debut in 1981 through to the end of the fourth season in 1984. After Martin left (of her own accord), the character was initially portrayed as "missing and presumed dead". The series recast the role with actress Emma Samms at the end of the fifth season in 1985.

Martin hosted Saturday Night Live on February 16, 1985. In the 2000s, she was artistic director of the Interplanetary Theater Group, in Idaho. Since then, she has worked sporadically in film and television.

Martin has spoken about her struggle with interstitial cystitis. In 1984, Martin, who has long been involved in environmental causes, appeared in a public service announcement to help save pink dolphins in the Amazon River. The ad was directed by Clyde Lucas, who appeared on The Hardy Boys/Nancy Drew Mysteries.

Filmography

Film

Television

Awards and nominations

References

External links
 
 
 
 

1953 births
Living people
Actresses from Connecticut
American film actresses
American soap opera actresses
American stage actresses
American television actresses
Female models from Connecticut
People from Westport, Connecticut
20th-century American actresses
21st-century American actresses